Basic Books is a book publisher founded in 1950 and located in New York City, now an imprint of Hachette Book Group. It publishes books in the fields of psychology, philosophy, economics, science, politics, sociology, current affairs, and history.

History
Basic Books originated as a small Greenwich Village-based book club marketed to psychoanalysts. Arthur Rosenthal took over the book club in 1950, and under his ownership it soon began producing original books, mostly in the behavioral sciences. Early successes included Ernest Jones's The Life and Work of Sigmund Freud, as well as works by Claude Lévi-Strauss, Jean Piaget and Erik Erikson. Irving Kristol joined Basic Books in 1960, and helped Basic to expand into the social sciences. Harper & Row purchased the company in 1969.

In 1997, HarperCollins announced that it would merge Basic Books into its trade publishing program, effectively closing the imprint and ending its publishing of serious academic books.  That same year, Basic was purchased by the newly created Perseus Books Group. Perseus's publishing business was acquired by Hachette Book Group in 2016. In 2018, Seal Press became an imprint of Basic.

Authors

Basic's list of authors includes:

 Stephon Alexander
 Edward E. Baptist
 H.W. Brands
 Zbigniew Brzezinski
 Iris Chang
 Stephanie Coontz
 Richard Dawkins
 Andrea Dworkin
 Michael Eric Dyson
 Niall Ferguson
 Richard Feynman
 Richard Florida
 Martin Ford
 Howard Gardner
 Jonathan Haidt
 Victor Davis Hanson
 Judith L. Herman
 Christopher Hitchens
 Douglas Hofstadter
 Leszek Kolakowski
 Kevin M. Kruse
 Lawrence Lessig
 Robert Nozick
 Steven Pinker
 Samantha Power
 Eugene Rogan
 Lee Smolin
 Jacob Soll
 Jason Sokol
 Timothy Snyder
 Tamler Sommers
 Thomas Sowell
 Ian Stewart
 Beverly Daniel Tatum
 Sherry Turkle
 Eric Topol
 Michael Walzer
 Elizabeth Warren
 George Weigel
 Steven Weinberg
 Frank Wilczek
 Bee Wilson
 Richard Wrangham
 Irvin D. Yalom

References

External links
Basic Books website
Perseus Group website (archived February 25, 2017)
Samuel G. Freedman on the formation of Perseus Books

Book publishing companies based in New York (state)
Publishing companies established in 1950
American companies established in 1950
1950 establishments in New York City